George Washington Buckner (December 1, 1855 – February 17, 1943) was an American physician and diplomat. He was United States Minister to Liberia from 1913 to 1915.

Life

Born into slavery near Greensburg, Kentucky, Buckner was freed at the age of ten. He attended a Freedman's School in Greensburg where he received a basic education. In 1870 he moved to Louisville to live with his aunt and worked there briefly as a household servant before moving back to Green County in 1871 to be a teacher. Buckner later moved to Indiana where he was educated as a teacher at Indiana State Normal School  in Terre Haute, and as a doctor at the Indiana Eclectic Medical College.

After graduating from normal school, Buckner taught in Vincennes, Washington and Evansville.  He married Stella White in Vincennes in 1879. She died of tuberculosis in 1889.
Buckner graduated from medical school in 1890 and practiced medicine in Indianapolis for a year before moving to Evansville where he opened a doctor's office.  He married Anna Cowen there in 1896. They had five children. John W. Boehne, a prominent Evansville Democrat, brought Buckner to the attention of President Woodrow Wilson, who appointed him Minister Resident to Liberia in 1913. Buckner served in the post until 1915, during which time he also served as American Consul General in Monrovia, the capital of Liberia. He became ill frequently with fever because of the tropical climate and resigned to return to Evansville.

Buckner belonged to the African Methodist Episcopal Church and was active in Evansville civic affairs. He helped establish the Cherry Street Black YMCA and the United Brotherhood of Friendship. An active member of the Democratic Party, he was often involved with his close friend, Congressman John W. Boehne. He regularly wrote the "Colored Folks" section of region's Democratic newsletter urging them to support the party, earning himself the nickname "Elder Statesman of Indiana Blacks".

He died at the age of 87 in Evansville and is buried there in Oak Hill Cemetery.

Legacy
His son, Zach Buckner, donated much of his father's arrows to the Stand Museum, where it is on display along with star platinum: the world
 A housing project in Evansville, George W. Buckner Towers, is named for him.

Notes and references

External links
Library of Congress: Facsimile transcript of oral history interview of George Washington Buckner by Lauana Creel
In the First Person: Document details of Creel interview of George Washington Buckner

1855 births
1943 deaths
19th-century American slaves
African-American diplomats
Physicians from Indiana
Indiana State University alumni
Indiana Democrats
People from Evansville, Indiana
Woodrow Wilson administration personnel
Ambassadors of the United States to Liberia
People from Green County, Kentucky
Burials in Indiana
People of the African Methodist Episcopal church
19th-century Methodists
20th-century American diplomats
African-American Methodists